Mordechai Bibi (1 July 1922 – 5 February 2023) was an Israeli politician who served as a member of the Knesset for Ahdut HaAvoda and its successors between 1959 and 1974.

Biography
Born in Baghdad in Iraq, Bibi was one of the founders of the Pioneering Zionist Underground movement in Iraq in 1942. Between 1944 and 1945 he directed the Aliyah Committee in Iraq on behalf of Mossad LeAliyah Bet. In 1945 Bibi himself made aliyah to Mandatory Palestine, and was involved in helping with mass immigration from Iraq between 1949 and 1950. He also studied law at Tel Aviv University, and was certified as a lawyer.

From 1953 until 1959 Bibi worked for the Ministry of Defense. A member of Ahdut HaAvoda from 1946, he became a member of the party's central committee and secretariat in 1958. The following year he was elected to the Knesset, and retained his seat in elections in 1961, 1965 and  1969, by which time Ahdut HaAvoda had merged into the Alignment. Between 1969 and 1974 he served as a Deputy Speaker, before losing his seat in the 1973 elections.

During the 1980s he published two books, From the Four Corners of the Rivers (1983) and The Pioneering Zionist Underground in Iraq (1988).

References

External links
 

1922 births
2023 deaths
People from Baghdad
Iraqi Jews
Aliyah Bet
Iraqi emigrants to Mandatory Palestine
Israeli people of Iraqi-Jewish descent
Israeli centenarians
Israeli civil servants
Israeli non-fiction writers
Alignment (Israel) politicians
Ahdut HaAvoda politicians
Israeli Labor Party politicians
Members of the 4th Knesset (1959–1961)
Members of the 5th Knesset (1961–1965)
Members of the 6th Knesset (1965–1969)
Members of the 7th Knesset (1969–1974)
Men centenarians
Deputy Speakers of the Knesset